New Live and Rare is a compilation EP that was released in 1988 of songs recorded by Echo & the Bunnymen. The EP was released on CD by WEA in Japan.

The EP brings together the songs "People Are Strange" from the soundtrack to the film The Lost Boys, "The Killing Moon (All Night Version)" from the extended 12-inch single and live versions of "All You Need Is Love", "Paint It, Black", "Run, Run, Run", "Friction" and "Do It Clean". "All You Need Is Love" was recorded for a Channel 4 programme called Play at Home; "Paint It, Black", "Run, Run, Run" and "Friction" were recorded on 25 April 1985 at the Karen in Gothenburg, Sweden for the Bommen radio show on Swedish National Radio.  Sleeve incorrectly states "Do It Clean" was recorded live at the Royal Albert Hall, London July 18, 1983 but this track was recorded at the "Karen" in Gothenburg, on 25 April 1985 with the other live tracks.

Track listings 
 "People Are Strange" (The Doors) – 3:39
 "The Killing Moon (All Night Version)" (Will Sergeant, Ian McCulloch, Les Pattinson, Pete de Freitas) – 9:11
 "All You Need Is Love" (Lennon/McCartney) – 6:44
 "Paint It, Black" (live) (Jagger/Richards) – 3:19
 "Run, Run, Run" (live) (Lou Reed) – 3:45
 "Friction" (live) (Tom Verlaine) – 4:41
 "Do It Clean" (live) (Sergeant, McCulloch, Pattinson, de Freitas) – 9:39

Personnel

Musicians 
 Ian McCulloch – vocals, guitar
 Will Sergeant – guitar
 Les Pattinson – bass guitar
 Pete de Freitas – drums

Production 
 Ray Manzarek – producer ("People Are Strange")
 David Lord – producer ("The Killing Moon (All Night Version)")
 The Bunnymen – producer ("All You Need Is Love")
 Lars Aldman – producer ("Paint It, Black", "Run, Run, Run" and "Friction")
 Bill Drummond – mixed by ("Do It Clean")

References 

1988 EPs
Echo & the Bunnymen EPs